Marzipan is a confection consisting primarily of sugar, honey, and almond meal (ground almonds), sometimes augmented with almond oil or extract.

It is often made into sweets; common uses are chocolate-covered marzipan and small marzipan imitations of fruits and vegetables. It can also be used in biscuits or rolled into thin sheets and glazed for icing cakes, primarily birthday cakes, wedding cakes and Christmas cakes. Marzipan paste may also be used as a baking ingredient, as in stollen or banket. In some countries, it is shaped into small figures of animals as a traditional treat for New Year's Day or Christmas. Marzipan is also used in Tortell, and in some versions of king cake eaten during the Carnival season.

Around the world

Europe 

The Geographical indications and traditional specialities in the European Union recognize two marzipans in Europe: one in Toledo (Spain) and one in Lübeck (Germany).

Southern Europe 
In Spain it is a traditional Christmas dessert (mazapán), although in Toledo, where the first written reference of this product dates back to 1512, it is eaten all year round. May 9 and 10 are also special days for eating marzipan in Sicily. In Portugal, where the confection has been traditionally made by nuns, marzipan is used to make fruit-shaped sweets; in the Algarve region in particular it is a very common sweet, where it is shaped like fruits and filled with Fios de ovos. There are other regions, as Toledo in Spain in which marzipan is shaped into simple animal shapes, and sometimes filled in with egg yolk and sugar. In Greece and Cyprus, marzipan is made in a variety of shapes and sizes and is almost always left white. In the islands of the Aegean in particular, white marzipan is considered a wedding treat and is served to guests at wedding feasts.
In Malta marzipan is used as a filling in the traditional Maltese Easter treats called Figolla.

Northern Europe 
In Denmark, Sweden and Norway, it is customary to snack on marzipan pigs around Christmas, marzipan shaped as eggs around Easter, and kransekage on New Year's Eve. It is also used in a large variety of cakes and confectioneries unrelated to the holidays, including træstammer, gåsebryst, and napoleonshatte, and as an ingredient in remonce-filling for Danish pastry.

In Maiasmokk café in Tallinn, Estonia, there is a small museum dedicated to the history and manufacture of marzipan.

Traditional Swedish princess cake is typically covered with a layer of marzipan that has been tinted pale green or pink.

Western and Central Europe 

In Belgium and the Netherlands, marzipan figures are given as Saint Nicholas's presents.

In Germany, it is common to gift marzipan in the shape of a loaf of bread or in the shape of small potatoes during Christmas time. Stollen can contain marzipan, and it is often featured as an ingredient in seasonal baked goods, such as Bethmännchen, Dominosteine and other Christmas cookies.
Mozartkugeln are a famed export of Austria made of marzipan balls dipped in dark chocolate.

In the United Kingdom, celebratory fruitcakes are decorated with a layer of marzipan- particularly Christmas cake which is covered with white sugar icing, and at Easter the Simnel cake contains a layer of marzipan, a further layer decorates the top and is lightly grilled or toasted to colour it. Battenberg cake, which originates in England, is covered in a layer of marzipan.

In Geneva, a traditional part of the celebration of L'Escalade is the ritual smashing of a chocolate cauldron filled with marzipan vegetables, a reference to a Savoyard siege of the city which was supposedly foiled by a housewife with a cauldron of boiling soup.

Middle East 
In Syria, marzipan (known as  lozina), or Marçabén (مرصبان) (Arabic word derived from lawz = "almond") is flavoured with orange-flower water and shaped into roses and other delicate flowers before they are baked. Marzipan can also be made from oatmeal, farina, or semolina. For Jews in Iran, marzipan fruit is a traditional Passover treat, replacing biscuits and cakes.

The Americas 
In Latin American cuisine, marzipan is known by the Spanish word mazapán and is also traditionally eaten at Christmas. In Latin American countries there is another, different confection called mazapan, made with peanuts. Mexican mazapán is typically made of peanut paste.

Asia 
In the Indian state of Goa, marzipan was introduced from Portugal. However, the Goan version uses cashew nuts instead of almonds. Goan marzipan is used to make Easter eggs. It is also used to make Christmas sweets in various shapes like fruits, flowers, stars, etc. Similarly, in the city of Mumbai, the East Indians mould their cashewnut-based or almond-based marzipan into different shapes for Christmas and into marzipan eggs, chickens and bonnets for Easter.

In the Philippines marzipan was brought from Spain,  (Spanish for "pili marzipan") is made from pili nuts.

History 
There are two proposed lines of origin for marzipan; they are not necessarily contradictory and may be complementary, as there have always been Mediterranean trade and cooking influences. Other sources establish the origin of marzipan in China, from where the recipe moved on to the Middle East and then to Europe through Al-Andalus.

Northeast Mediterranean line 

Although it is believed to have been introduced to Eastern Europe through the Turks (badem ezmesi in Turkish, and most notably produced in Edirne), there is some dispute between Hungary and Italy over its origin. Marzipan became a specialty of the Hanseatic League port towns. In particular, the cities of Lübeck and Tallinn have a proud tradition of marzipan manufacture. Examples include Lübecker Marzipan (PGI). The city's manufacturers such as Niederegger still guarantee their marzipan to contain two-thirds almonds by weight, which results in a product of highest quality. Historically, the city of Königsberg in East Prussia was also renowned for its distinctive marzipan production. Königsberg marzipan remains a special type of marzipan in Germany that is golden brown on its surface and sometimes embedded with marmalade at its centre.

In the U.S., marzipan is not officially defined, but it is generally made with a higher ratio of sugar to almonds than almond paste. One brand, for instance, has 28% almonds in its marzipan, and 45% almonds in its almond paste. However, in Sweden and Finland almond paste refers to a marzipan that contains 50% ground almonds, a much higher quality than regular marzipan. In Germany, Lübecker Marzipan is known for its quality. It contains 66% almonds. The original manually produced Mozartkugeln are made from green pistachio marzipan.

Iberian Peninsula line 

Another possible geographic origin is the parts of Spain that were known as Al-Andalus. In Toledo (850–900, though more probably 1150 during the reign of Alfonso VII) this specialty was known as Postre Regio (instead of Mazapán). There are also mentions in The Book of One Thousand and One Nights of an almond paste eaten during Ramadan and as an aphrodisiac.
Mazapán is Toledo's most famous dessert, often created for Christmas, and has PGI status. For this, almonds have to be at least 50% of the total weight, following the directives of Mazapán de Toledo regulator council.
Another idea to support this line is the important tradition of another Spanish almond-based Christmas confectionery, the turrón.

Variations 
Persipan is a similar, but less expensive product, in which the almonds are replaced by apricot or peach kernels. Many confectionery products sold as marzipan are made from less expensive materials, such as soy paste and almond essence. To control and detect the authenticity of marzipan, polymerase chain reaction methods can differentiate almonds from substitutes and adulterants at concentrations less than 1%. German marzipan is made by grinding whole almonds with sugar and partially drying the paste, and French marzipan (called 'massepain') is made by combining ground almonds with sugar syrup. Some marzipan is flavoured with rosewater. Spanish marzipan is made without bitter almonds. In the U.S, bitter almonds are not used in marzipan because the importation of bitter almonds into the U.S. is prohibited by U.S. law, owing to them containing a substance related to cyanide. Sugar free marzipan can be made by replacing sugar with polyols such as maltitol. Varieties made with other types of nuts are eaten in Latin America, and peanut-based marzipan is the most common variety in Mexico.

Etymology 

The German name has largely ousted the original English name marchpane with the same apparent derivation: "March bread". (The word marchpane occurs in Shakespeare's Romeo and Juliet, Act 1, Scene 5, Line 9.) Marzapane is documented earlier in Italian than in any other language, and the sense "bread" for pan is Romance. The origin could be from the Latin term , which means bread of March. However, the ultimate etymology is unclear; for example, the Italian word derives from the Latin words "Massa" (itself from Greek  "Maza") meaning pastry and "Pan" meaning bread, this can be particularly seen in the Provençal massapan, the Portuguese maçapão (where 'ç' is an alternative form for the phoneme 'ss') and old Spanish mazapán – the change from 'ss' to 'z' in Latin words was common in old Spanish and the 'r' appeared later. Among the other possible etymologies set forth in the Oxford English Dictionary, one theory proposes that the word "marzipan" may be a corruption of Martaban, a Burmese city famous for its jars.

The Real Academia Española suggests the idea of the Spanish word mazapán to be derived from the Hispanic Arabic بسمة pičmáṭ, which is derived from the Greek .

Another source could be from Arabic موثابان mawthābān "king who sits still". The Arabic, Latinised as matapanus, was used to describe a Venetian coin depicting an enthroned Christ the King. These coins were stored in ornate boxes. From about the fifteenth century, when the coins were no longer in circulation, the boxes became decorative containers for storing and serving luxury sweetmeats. One such luxury that crept into the box in the sixteenth century is the now-famous almond-flavoured marzipan, named (at least proximately) after the box in which it was stored.

However, if marzipan has its origin in Persia, it is not unlikely that the name may come from Marzban (in Persian: مرزبان, derived from the words Marz مرز meaning "border" or "boundary" and the suffix -bān بان meaning guardian), a class of margraves or military commanders in charge of border provinces of the Sassanid Empire of Persia (Iran) between the 3rd and 7th centuries.

Production 
To produce marzipan, raw almonds are cleaned "by sieving, air elutriation, and other electronic or mechanical devices", then immersed in water with a temperature just below the boiling point for about five minutes, in a process known as blanching. This loosens the almonds' skin, which is removed by passing the almonds through rubber-covered rotating cylinders. They are then cooled, after which they are coarsely chopped and ground, with up to 35% sugar, into almond flour.

The almond flour mixture is roasted and cooled, after which sucrose (table sugar) and possibly a binding agent such as starch syrup or sorbitol are added. It may then be moulded into any shape. Marzipan must be covered in an airtight container to prevent it from hardening and dehydrating. It should be protected from direct light to prevent rancidity of almond oil, a result of lipid oxidation.

Science

Molecular composition 

The aroma and flavor of marzipan can be attributed to benzaldehyde and hydrogen cyanide, which both derive from the benzoin condensation reaction.

Physical structure 
Marzipan is a food emulsion that contains four phases: a solid phase of suspended particles including almonds and sugars, a suspended air pocket phase formed from incorporated air during mixing, a water phase, and a lipid phase from almond oil. The phases can separate when left alone for long periods of time. It is stabilized by the phospholipids and triglycerides found in the almond cells. The fatty acids found in almonds include saturated fats such as stearic acid and unsaturated fats such as linoleic acid. Emulsifiers can be added during production to increase shelf life.

Marzipan's softness is a balance between the solid and liquid components. It should have a moisture content of less than 10%.

See also 

 Aboukir almonds – marzipan-covered almonds originating in Abu Qir
 Battenberg cake – a light sponge cake covered in marzipan
 Bethmännchen – a traditional German pastry which contains marzipan
 Cassata – a multi-layered Sicilian sponge cake covered in marzipan
 Frangipane – an almond-flavored pastry cream
 Halva – Some types are made from sesame paste or sunflower seed butter and sugar
 Hübner Haus – Site of a former famous marzipan factory and pastry shop in Hamburg, Germany
 List of almond dishes
 Frutta martorana – marzipan confectionary shaped and colored to resemble fruit
 Simnel cake – a light fruit cake covered in marzipan

References

Bibliography

External links 

 German Food Guide: Marzipan
 Etymology of "marzipan"
 Marzipan museum

 
Christmas food
Christmas in Spain
Estonian cuisine
German confectionery
Italian confectionery
Mexican desserts
Portuguese confectionery
Sinterklaas food
Spanish confectionery
Swiss confectionery
Food paste